Max Andrew Mata (born 10 July 2000) is a New Zealand professional footballer who plays as a forward for League of Ireland club Sligo Rovers and the New Zealand national team.

Club career

New Zealand
After shining in New Zealand as the youngest goalscorer in the country's top-flight at 15, Mata would travel to Switzerland to train with Swiss giants, Grasshoppers. After an impressive trial period, he signed for the club.

Grasshoppers
After scoring four goals in his first seven games for the reserves, he was loaned to Estonian side, Nõmme Kalju, in 2019 to further his development in a first-team environment. Mata never established himself with Zurich's first-team.

Nõmme Kalju
After joining on loan, Mata made his professional debut for Nõmme Kalju in their 5–0 loss to Celtic in the UEFA Champions League second qualifying round on 24 July 2019. Mata would make 20 appearances for the club in all competitions, scoring 12 times.

Real Monarchs
With no future for Mata in Switzerland, he left the club on a free transfer in December 2020 and signed for American second-tier side, Real Monarchs.

Sligo Rovers
On 15 February 2022, it was announced that Mata had signed for League of Ireland Premier Division club Sligo Rovers.

International career

U-20
Mata was named in the New Zealand U-20 side for the 2019 FIFA U-20 World Cup. He was picked for the tournament even though he would be unavailable for the first two games of the tournament due to a red card that he picked up in the final of the OFC U-19 Championship qualifiers. Mata ended up making two appearances for the U-20s, first in the last group game against Uruguay, where he captained the team, and in the round of 16 penalty shootout loss to Colombia.

National team
Mata made his international debut on 15 November 2019, coming on as a substitute for New Zealand in their 0–1 loss to Lithuania. After a king spell out of the national team, he earned a call up in March 2023 for two friendly fixtures against China.

Personal life
Mata is of Māori and Cook Island Māori descent.

Honours

International
 OFC U-17 Championship: 2017
 OFC U-19 Championship: 2018

Individual
2018 OFC U-19 Championship: Golden Boot

References

External links

2000 births
Living people
Association football forwards
New Zealand association footballers
New Zealand international footballers
New Zealand Māori people
Real Monarchs players
Wellington Phoenix FC players
Nõmme Kalju FC players
Sligo Rovers F.C. players
League of Ireland players
Expatriate association footballers in the Republic of Ireland
Expatriate footballers in Estonia
New Zealand expatriate association footballers
Expatriate soccer players in the United States
Expatriate footballers in Switzerland
New Zealand under-20 international footballers
Meistriliiga players
New Zealand expatriate sportspeople in Estonia
New Zealand expatriate sportspeople in Switzerland
New Zealand expatriate sportspeople in the United States
New Zealand expatriate sportspeople in Ireland